Akbarpur is a village in Rohtas block of Rohtas district, Bihar, India. Located on the bank of the Son river, a short distance east of the historic Rohtasgarh fort, Akbarpur is the headquarters of Rohtas block. As of 2011, it had a population of 9,236, in 1,491 households. Akbarpur covers 333 hectares and 6.73 km2.

History
The history of Akbarpur goes back to the Mughal period. An extant chardiwarrah-style tomb near Akbarpur bears a Persian inscription that identifies it as the tomb of one Malik Wishal Khan, a native of Chainpur, the faujdar and Qiladar of Rohtasgarh fort under Shah Jahan. Malik Wishal Khan had the tomb built for himself and his family, and construction took place between 1636 and 1638.During his time Akhlaskh Khan of Bhabua was Jagirdar of this region who  appointed him as a faujdar. Akhlaskh Khan's jagir was a part of Ghazipur Sarkar.The village has a large Muslim community who are mostly Malik Wishal Khan's descendents and are mostly Niazi and Yusufzai Pathans.

During the Indian Rebellion of 1857, Akbarpur became a stronghold of the rebel leader Kunwar Singh. In October 1858, mutineers from the Ramgarh battalion took up a position in Akbarpur after being defeated at Chatra. They were joined by some of Kunwar Singh's troops, but they were defeated by the British and forced to retreat.

In 1921, Akbarpur had a population of 2,037. At that time, it was the southern terminus of the Dehri-Rohtas Light Railway, and the ruins of an old indigo factory were noted here as well.

References 

History of Bihar
Villages in Rohtas district